José Batlle y Ordóñez is a small town in the northwest of Lavalleja Department in Uruguay.

Geography
It is in close proximity to Nico Pérez, separated from it partly by Route 7 and partly by the railroad tracks. The two parts are joined by a bridge passing over the tracks.

History
A populated centre was founded here on 9 December 1883. The initial (common) village was named "Nico Pérez" and recognized as such by decree of 10 April 1896. On 19 March 1907 it was renamed to "José Batlle y Ordóñez" by decree Ley Nº 3.148. The part of the village that is in the Florida Department kept the original name.

Population
In 2011 José Batlle y Ordóñez had a population of 2,203.
 
Source: Instituto Nacional de Estadística de Uruguay

Places of worship
 St. Nicholas of Bari Parish Church (Roman Catholic)

References

External links
INE map of José Batlle y Ordoñez and Nico Pérez (Florida)

Populated places in the Lavalleja Department